Mohammed Majed Ibrahim (in Arabic: محمد إبراهيم; born April 10, 1983 in Houston, Texas) is a Lebanese professional basketball player who plays for Hekmeh BC of the Lebanese Basketball League. Mohammed has represented the Lebanese national basketball team multiple times. He is 193 cm tall and plays point guard / shooting guard.

Career

From 2003–2005, he played for Lebanese Basketball League team Al Riyadi. He then moved back to the US and played Division 1 basketball for the Louisiana Tech Bulldogs in 2005–06. He then played Division 2 basketball in 2006–07 for the Incarnate World Cardinals.

He then moved back to Lebanon and played for Al Riyadi in 2008–09. He then played the 2009–10 season with Al Mouttahed Tripoli but returned to Al Riyadi for 2010–11. After the 2011 FIBA Asia Championship, he signed with Champville. After a season with Champville, he moved to Sagesse for 2012–13. In 2013–14, he played one game for Sagesse before moving to Byblos in January 2014. Then he moved to Tadamon Club before returning to Sagesse Club.

National team

Mohammed was part of the Lebanon national basketball team for the 2003 ABC Championship and also the 2011 FIBA Asia Championship.

References

External links
Profile at Eurobasket.com
Profile at RealGM.com

1983 births
Living people
Lebanese men's basketball players
Louisiana Tech Bulldogs basketball players
Shooting guards
Sagesse SC basketball players
Al Riyadi Club Beirut basketball players